Digama spilosoma is a moth of the family Erebidae. Formerly the genus Digama was placed in the family Erebidae, subfamily Aganainae or Agaristinae. 
It is found in Africa, including South Africa.

External links
 Species info
 Species info oat African Moth

Endemic moths of South Africa
Arctiinae
Moths described in 1874